Ardscoil Na Mara is a secondary school located in Tramore, County Waterford. The school was established in 2001 following the amalgamation of the Stella Maris, Tramore and C.B.S. Tramore. As of May 2022, it has 1,186 pupils. The school offers multiple extracurricular activities, for example, sports, a sustainability committee, etc. The school has a café. The school is a Catholic faith school, and as such, has prayer services quite often.

References

External links
School website

Secondary schools in County Waterford